TVSA or Televizija Kantona Sarajevo (Sarajevo Canton Television) is a public TV channel founded by Assembly of Sarajevo Canton. Headquarters of TVSA is located in capital city of Bosnia and Herzegovina, Sarajevo (along with national and entity level public broadcaster – BHRT and RTVFBiH). Thanks to TV shows from its own production, TVSA programming becomes recognizable and widely viewed television station in Sarajevo. TV shows promote multiculturalism and specific culture, tradition and customs characteristic for the Sarajevo area and Bosnia and Herzegovina.

This television channel broadcasts a variety of programs such as news, talk shows, documentaries, sports, movies, mosaic, children's programs, etc.

Zlatko Topčić managed TVSA from 2013 to 2016.

History
"Television Sarajevo" is the direct predecessor to today's Radio Television of Bosnia and Herzegovina, a local television network broadcasting a TV channel in Bosnia and Herzegovina. The headquarters was in Sarajevo. Televizija Sarajevo was the first Bosnian-Herzegovinian television channel, when it debuted in 1961, although television service in Bosnia and Herzegovina had begun five years earlier.

Programming

Series
Karađoz (1969 –71), starring Momo and Uzeir.
Top lista nadrealista (1984 –1991)
Memoari porodice Milić (1990)

Films
Husinska buna (1980)
A Little Bit of Soul (1987)

External links 
 

Communications in Bosnia and Herzegovina
Television channels and stations established in 1998
Television networks in Bosnia and Herzegovina
Television stations in Bosnia and Herzegovina
Mass media in Sarajevo
1998 establishments in Bosnia and Herzegovina
Companies based in Sarajevo
Bosnian-language mass media
Government-owned companies of Bosnia and Herzegovina